Basinovka (Baśıw) is a rural locality (a village) in Bakaldinsky Selsoviet, Arkhangelsky District, Bashkortostan, Russia. The population was 133 as of 2010. There are 3 streets.

Geography 
Basinovka is located 16 km northeast of Arkhangelskoye (the district's administrative centre) by road. Ustye-Bassy is the nearest rural locality.

References 

Rural localities in Arkhangelsky District